Tamara Sujú Roa is a Venezuelan criminal lawyer and human rights specialist.

Career 
Tamara is the founder of several NGOs, including Fundación Nueva Conciencia Nacional, Damas en Blanco en Venezuela and Fundapresos, an aid and juridic assistance organization for commons prisoners that worked in Venezuela from 2002 to 2006. She is currently the executive director of the human rights observatory Centro de Estudios para América Latina (CASLA), whose headquarters are in the Czech Republic, former international coordinator of Foro Penal and columnist with La Razón, an independent media outfit in Caracas. She is a senior fellow at the Raoul Wallenberg Centre for Human Rights.

A graduate of Andrés Bello Catholic University, Sujú has been accused by government officials of committing destabilization acts and have pointed her out as the niece of General Oswaldo Sujú, involved in the 2002 Venezuelan coup d'état attempt. Nicolás Maduro, while being president of the National Assembly, declared that she "betrayed the fatherland" and that she was a part of the CIA. In August 2014, Tamara requested political asylum in Prague after fearing "for her freedom and physical integrity"; the international protection status was granted by the government of the Czech Republic for a period of ten renewable years on 24 November.

The lawyer has recompiled torture cases registered in Venezuela between 2002 and 2014 and formalized a demand against Nicolás Maduro in the International Criminal Court in July 2016. On 5 April 2017, Sujú was invited by the InterAmerican Institute for democracy to testify about the torture cases in Venezuela and the country's expedient in the Court. Her expedient started with 65 incidents when presented before the Court, and was updated in May 2017. On 14 September 2017, she testified about 289 cases of torture during the first audience of the Organization of American States (OAS) to analyze possible crimes against humanity in the country, including incidents during the 2017 Venezuelan protests and 192 cases of sexual torture.

References

People from Caracas
Venezuelan women lawyers
Venezuelan human rights activists
Women human rights activists
Anti-torture activists
Andrés Bello Catholic University alumni
21st-century Venezuelan lawyers
Year of birth missing (living people)
Living people
21st-century women lawyers
Venezuelan emigrants